"Anona" is a popular song supposedly written by Vivian Grey (pseudonym for Mabel McKinley, niece of William McKinley), but in fact composed by Robert Keiser King in 1903, both as an intermezzo and a vocal number. Popular in its day, it was recorded a number of times.

Lyrics
The lyrics as published in the vocal version:

References

Bibliography

Grey, Vivian. "Anona" (Intermezzo-Two Step) (Sheet music). New York: Leo Feist (1903).
Grey, Vivian. "Anona" (Vocal) (Sheet music). New York: Leo Feist (1903).

External links
"Anona", Henry Burr (Columbia Phonograph Co. 32316, c. 1903)—Cylinder Preservation and Digitization Project.
"Anona", Mabel McKinley (Edison Amberol 150, 1909)—Cylinder Preservation and Digitization Project.

1903 songs